Quercus albocincta is a species of oak tree. It is native to the Sierra Madre Occidental of western Mexico, in the states of Sonora, Chihuahua, Durango, and Sinaloa. It has also been found in the southernmost part of Baja California Sur.

References

albocincta
Endemic oaks of Mexico
Flora of the Sierra Madre Occidental
Trees of Sonora
Trees of Sinaloa
Trees of Durango
Trees of Chihuahua (state)
Trees of Baja California Sur
Least concern flora of North America
Plants described in 1924
Taxonomy articles created by Polbot
Taxa named by William Trelease